Orihuela Deportiva Club de Fútbol was a Spanish football team based in Orihuela, in the Valencian Community.

Founded in 1944 and dissolved 50 years later, it managed to play two seasons in Segunda División, the first in 1952. After finishing fifth in the 1990–91 season, the club was relegated due to financial irregularities, and disappeared three years later.

Club background
Orihuela Deportiva Club de Fútbol - (1944–95)
Orihuela Club de Fútbol - (1993–)

Club naming
Orihuela CF - (1944–45)
Orihuela Deportiva CF - (1945–95)

Season to season

2 seasons in Segunda División
5 seasons in Segunda División B
38 seasons in Tercera División

References

Association football clubs established in 1944
Association football clubs disestablished in 1995
Defunct football clubs in the Valencian Community
Orihuela CF
1944 establishments in Spain
1995 disestablishments in Spain
Segunda División clubs